Customer Support is a range of  services to assist customers in making cost effective and correct use of a product. It includes assistance in planning, installation, training, troubleshooting, maintenance, upgrading, and disposal of a product. Regarding technology products such as mobile phones, televisions, computers, software products or other electronic or mechanical goods, it is termed technical support.

Phone and Emails are the primary means to offer web-based assistance for your customers when matters do not require an immediate answer. Low-cost, non-intrusive and anywhere-anytime access are some of the advantages of email-based communications. Trouble Ticketing System and CRM Applications help keep track of a series of follow-up correspondence with a particular customer. Services offered via email response management is claims processing, polling/media analysis, subscription services, troubleshooting, complaint registrations etc.

Being a successful Customer Support agent requires a full skillset of abilities that will allow one to communicate efficiently with the customer and provide fast and effective solutions to their problems.

See also
Customer Success
Automation
Customer service
Help desk software
Web chat
Professional services automation
Run Book Automation (RBA)
Technical support

References

Computer telephony integration  
Automation
Services marketing 
Customer service
Help desk
Telephony